The Unforgettable Director of Love Movies is a 1990 Turkish comedy film directed by Yavuz Turgul.

Cast 
 Şener Şen - Hasmet Asilkan
 Pıtırcık Akerman - Jeyan
  - Nihat
  - Hakki
 Oktay Kaynarca - Tarcan
  - Hasmet's Ex-Wife
  - Tolga
  - Betül
  - Ceren

References

External links 

1990 comedy films
1990 films
Turkish comedy films
1990s Turkish-language films